Juan Aguirre y Gorozpe (1599 – 21 September 1671) was a Roman Catholic prelate who served as Bishop of Durango (1659–1671).

Biography
Juan Aguirre y Gorozpe was born in Tecamachalco, México in 1599.
On 17 November 1659, he was appointed during the papacy of Pope Alexander VII as Bishop of Durango. On 19 December 1660, he was consecrated bishop by Mateo de Sagade de Bugueyro, Archbishop of México. He served as Bishop of Durango until his death on 21 September 1671.

See also 
Catholic Church in Mexico

References

External links and additional sources
 (for Chronology of Bishops) 
 (for Chronology of Bishops) 

17th-century Roman Catholic bishops in Mexico
Bishops appointed by Pope Alexander VII
1599 births
1671 deaths